Tennessee's 17th Senate district is one of 33 districts in the Tennessee Senate. It has been represented by Republican Mark Pody since a 2017 special election to replace fellow Republican Mae Beavers.

Geography
District 17 covers rural and suburban Middle Tennessee to the east of Nashville, including all of Cannon, Clay, DeKalb, Macon, Smith, and Wilson Counties. Communities in the district include Mount Juliet, Lebanon, Smithville, Lafayette, Carthage, Woodbury, Celina, and Green Hill.

The district is located entirely within Tennessee's 6th congressional district, and overlaps with the 38th, 40th, 46th, and 57th districts of the Tennessee House of Representatives. It borders the state of Kentucky.

Recent election results
Tennessee Senators are elected to staggered four-year terms, with odd-numbered districts holding elections in midterm years and even-numbered districts holding elections in presidential years.

2018

2017 special
In August 2017, incumbent Republican Mae Beavers resigned to focus on her ultimately unsuccessful gubernatorial campaign, triggering a special election that December.

2014

Federal and statewide results in District 17

References 

17
Cannon County, Tennessee
Clay County, Tennessee
DeKalb County, Tennessee
Macon County, Tennessee
Smith County, Tennessee
Wilson County, Tennessee